Malovidy is a village and part of Vracovice in Benešov District in the Central Bohemian Region of the Czech Republic. It has about 100 inhabitants.

References

Neighbourhoods in the Czech Republic
Populated places in Benešov District